A referendum on re-integration into France was held in the Swedish colony of Saint Barthélemy in late October 1877. The island had been a colonial possession of Sweden for nearly a century, but following the referendum in which only one person voted against the proposal, it was returned to France the following year.

Background
The island had been part of the French West Indies until 1784, when it was transferred to Sweden in return for trade privileges in Gothenburg. However, the island proved expensive for Sweden to maintain. An agreement was made on 10 August 1877 on returning the island to French control, the first article of which included the requirement of a binding referendum.

Results

Aftermath
The results were announced on 31 October 1877. Subsequently the French National Assembly approved the treaty on 22 January 1878. On 16 March 1878 the island became part of the jurisdiction of Guadeloupe and would remain so until 2003.

See also
1868 Danish West Indies status referendum
1870 Dominican Republic annexation referendum

References

1877 referendums
1877
Referendums in Sweden
1877 in the Caribbean
History of Saint Barthélemy
Sovereignty referendums
1870s in Guadeloupe
Former dependencies of Guadeloupe
France–Sweden relations